Liancheng Bridge is a cross-border bridge linking Yuhu District and Yuetang District over the Xiang River in Xiangtan, Hunan, China. The bridge deck is a two-way four lane urban trunk road.

History
Construction began on July 1, 2004 and at that time it was named "Xiangtan No.4 Bridge". It was renamed "Liancheng Bridge" in June 2006. It was completed on October 31, 2006, and cost more than 452.1 million yuan. It opened to traffic on July 12, 2007. On June 1, 2016, it cancelled the entry fees system.

References

Bridges in Hunan
Bridges completed in 2006
Buildings and structures completed in 2006
2006 establishments in China